The Le Mouvement socialiste (en: The Socialist Movement) was a revolutionary syndicalist journal in France founded in 1899 by Hubert Lagardelle and dissolved in 1914. Other key founders included Karl Marx's grandson Jean Longuet and Émile Durkheim's nephew Marcel Mauss. It advocated segregation of social classes; opposed bourgeois life, democracy, universal suffrage, and parliamentarism; and supported a society led by "conscious, rebellious" men that would develop a disciplined bold new man as part of a "worker's army". The journal was popular and attracted an international audience in its examination of Marxism and revolutionary syndicalism, with well-known revolutionary syndicalists contributing to it, such as Georges Sorel and Victor Griffuelhes.

References 

1899 establishments in France
1914 disestablishments in France
Defunct political magazines published in France
French-language magazines
Magazines established in 1899
Magazines disestablished in 1914
Socialism in France
Socialist magazines
Syndicalism
Revolutionary Syndicalism